The Peter Hansen House, located at 247 S. 200 East in Manti, Utah, was built in 1875.  It is historically significant as a Scandinavian-American folk architecture example.  It was built by Danish-born brickmason Peter Hansen who immigrated in the 1860s.  As brick was rare in Manti before the 1880s, it is believed that Hansen fired bricks for this house in a kiln on the property.  The house was sold for $500 in 1882.

It was listed on the National Register of Historic Places in 1983.

References

Pair-houses
Houses on the National Register of Historic Places in Utah
Houses completed in 1875
Houses in Sanpete County, Utah
National Register of Historic Places in Sanpete County, Utah